The Microsoft Lumia 430 is a mobile phone developed by Microsoft Mobile Oy for emerging markets. It was introduced in March 2015 to compete with Google's Android One. The phone offers Lumia Denim out of the box and comes pre-installed with Lumia Selfie.

Specifications

Hardware 

The Lumia 430 has a 4.0-inch IPS LCD display, dual-core 1.2 GHz Cortex-A7 Qualcomm Snapdragon 200 processor, 1 GB of RAM and 8 GB of internal storage that can be expanded using microSD cards up to 256 GB. The phone has a 1500 mAh Li-Ion battery, 2-megapixel rear camera and VGA front-facing camera. It is available in black and orange.

Software 

The Lumia 430 ships with Windows Phone 8.1.

Reception 

Jon Devo from TrustedReviews wrote: "We can only recommend the Microsoft Lumia 430 phone if you find the Windows Phone 8.1 OS preferable to Android. Otherwise stronger alternatives can be found for the money."

Sean Cameron from TechRadar pointed out the eye-catching looks, the sturdy, comfortable design and that it makes a great first impression, but disliked the poor screen, the bad camera and the laggy performance.

See also 

Microsoft Lumia
Microsoft Lumia 435
Microsoft Lumia 650

References

External links 
 Microsoft Lumia 430 Dual SIM

Microsoft Lumia
Mobile phones introduced in 2015
Discontinued smartphones
Windows Phone devices
Microsoft hardware
Mobile phones with user-replaceable battery